Swinney Recreation Center is home to UMKC Campus Recreation and is the student recreation center for UMKC. The recreation center includes a fitness center, 5 multipurpose basketball courts, several group fitness studios, 3 racquetball courts, a boxing room, a squash court, an indoor track, a recreational field, an outdoor track and a large aquatics center. The recreation center offers memberships for UMKC students, faculty and staff as well as community members. The recreation center also holds a 1,500-seat arena It is the home of the UMKC men's and women's basketball teams, known since the 2019–20 season as the Kansas City Roos. Under the school's previous athletic identity as the UMKC Kangaroos, the  men's basketball team played there from 1969 to 1986, and again from 2010 to 2012. The men returned at the beginning of 2019.  The Kansas City women's basketball team also currently plays their home games at Swinney Recreation Center.

Swinney Recreation Center was originally built in 1941 as Swinney Gymnasium by what was then the University of Kansas City.  It was named in honor of Edward F. Swinney, chairman of First National Bank of Kansas City (now part of Bank of America), who had donated $250,000 toward the project.  Long known as "Old Swinney," it was renamed Swinney Recreation Center after a $14.5 million addition in 1988.  The facility now has five basketball/volleyball courts, four racquetball courts, a 25-meter indoor/outdoor pool, and exercise rooms.

The men's team played at Swinney during its days as an NAIA member, and moved to Municipal Auditorium when it joined the NCAA.  However, in 2010, UMKC announced that the men's basketball team would make Swinney its primary home court. They moved back to Municipal just two years later.  They returned to the Swinney Recreation Center at the beginning of 2019.

See also
 List of NCAA Division I basketball arenas

References

External links
Official site

College basketball venues in the United States
Sports venues in Kansas City, Missouri
Basketball venues in Missouri
Kansas City Roos basketball
1940 establishments in Missouri
Sports venues completed in 1940
College volleyball venues in the United States
Sports venues in Missouri